Mohammed Abdus Shahid (born 1 January 1948) is a Bangladesh Awami League politician and the incumbent member of parliament for Moulvibazar-4.

He elected member of Parliament for consecutive 6 times from Moulovibazar-4. He was the former Chief Whip of the ruling party in the 9th National Parliament.

Early life
Shahid was born on 1 January 1948. He completed his master's degree in communication.

Career
Shahid was elected to Parliament in 1991, 1996, 2001, 2008, 2014 and 2018 from Moulvibazar-4 constituency as a Bangladesh Awami League candidate. He was the previously the chief whip of the opposition when Awami League was the opposition party. He was also a former president of Moulvibazar District Awami League.

References

Living people
1948 births
People from Moulvibazar District
Awami League politicians
5th Jatiya Sangsad members
7th Jatiya Sangsad members
8th Jatiya Sangsad members
9th Jatiya Sangsad members
10th Jatiya Sangsad members
11th Jatiya Sangsad members